The varicose rocksnail also known as the verrucose file snail, scientific name Lithasia verrucosa, is a species of freshwater snail with an operculum, an aquatic gastropod mollusk in the family Pleuroceridae. This species is endemic to the United States.

References 

Molluscs of the United States
Pleuroceridae
Gastropods described in 1820
Taxa named by Constantine Samuel Rafinesque
Taxonomy articles created by Polbot